Faith Thomas (1902-1982) was an American screenwriter active during the 1920s through the 1940s.

Biography 
Faith was born in Superior, Wisconsin, to Benjamin Thomas and Matilda Koehler. After her schooling, she became a stenographer and a court reporter in her home state. By the early 1920s, she had relocated to Hollywood, where after working as a stenographer she eventually began writing screenplays for Universal Pictures. She was on staff at Universal early as 1924 (when she was noted as the person in charge of production on Where the Worst Begins), although she didn't get her first credit until 1928's That's My Daddy.

Selected filmography 

 Rock River Renegades (1942)
 Conspiracy (1939)
 Hollywood Boulevard (1936)
 I Can't Escape (1934)
 The Big Bluff (1933) 
 Silks and Saddles (1929)
 Red Hot Speed (1928)
 That's My Daddy (1928)

References 

American women screenwriters
1902 births
1982 deaths
Screenwriters from Wisconsin
20th-century American women writers
20th-century American screenwriters